In paradisum is a Latin antiphon and movement of the Western Church's Requiem.

In Paradisum may also refer to:

Albums
In Paradisum, an album with requiems by Gabriel Fauré and Maurice Duruflé Cecilia Bartoli and Bryn Terfel 2010
In Paradisum, an album by The Hilliard Ensemble of music by Giovanni Pierluigi da Palestrina and Tomás Luis de Victoria 
In Paradisum (album), a 2011 album by Symfonia

Compositions
In Paradisum, a composition by Maurice Duruflé from his Requiem
In Paradisum, a composition by Karl Jenkins from his Requiem
In Paradisum, a composition by Théodore Dubois
In Paradisum, Op.25a, a composition by Huw Spratling

Songs
"In Paradisum", a song by Sarah Brightman from Eden
"In Paradisum", a song by Sissel Kyrkjebø from Into Paradise
"In Paradisum", a song by Symfonia from In Paradisum

Other
In Paradisum (record label), a French independent label